Ross Town F.C. was a football club based in Ross-on-Wye, Herefordshire, England. The club was formed in the summer of 1993 following the amalgamation of the town's two senior sides, Ross United and Woodville, and joined the Herefordshire League Premier Division. They joined the Hellenic Football League Division One in 1996 but dropped back down to the Herefordshire League in 2007. In late 2009 Ross Town resigned from the Herefordshire League and folded.

Their ground was on a loop of the River Wye. The club was affiliated to the Herefordshire County FA.

Defunct football clubs in Herefordshire
Association football clubs established in 1983
Association football clubs disestablished in 2009
1983 establishments in England
Ross-on-Wye
Defunct football clubs in England
Herefordshire Football League
Hellenic Football League
2009 disestablishments in England